Rodolfo "Jun" Sabayton (born November 23, 1973) is a Filipino actor, comedian, host and director. He is known as "Bayaw” due to his works with Lourd de Veyra at News5’s History with Lourd, Wasak, Word of the Lourd, Kontrabando, B.A.Y.A.W. for President advocacy campaign.

Jun Sabayton was born on November 23, 1973, in Cebu City. Jun's debut on TV was Strangebrew. He was a producer and a special participant in the show with his co-stars Angel "Erning" Rivero and the late Tado Jimenez in 2002.

Sabayton has also acted in movies. He was a host on TV5 and then moved to the Kapamilya Network, ABS-CBN 2, in around 2018. He was also a host of comedy science program You Have Been Warned Asia broadcast on the Discovery Channel.

Filmography

Television
 2022: Jose & Maria's Bongga Villa
 2022: Happy Together 
 2022: My Papa Pi
 2022: Lakwatsika 
 2021: Wag Po!
 2021: Chika Besh
 2021: Daddy's Gurl
 2021: Sing Galing 
 2021: Unang Hirit
 2020: Kaibigan 
 2020: LOL: Lunch Out Loud
 2020: All Out Sundays
 2020: Mars Pa More
 2020: Pepito Manaloto 
 2019: Wagas
 2019: Dear Uge
 2019: Bubble Gang 
 2019: Tadhana
 2018: Karelasyon 
 2018: Wish Ko Lang
 2018: Funny Ka, Pare Ko
 2018: Home Sweetie Home
 2018: Banana Sundae
 2017: You Have Been Warned Asia
 2017: It's Showtime
 2017: Eat Bulaga
 2017: Trops
 2017: Aksyon Sa Umaga
 2016: My Candidate
 2016: Barangay Utakan
 2016: Demolition Job
 2016: History With Lourd De Veyra
 2016: Funny Ka Pare Ko!
 2015-2016: News5 Kontrabando 
 2015: Wattpad Presents
 2015: Tanod (TV Series)
 2015: Mac & Chiz (TV Series)
 2015: Sapul Sa 5
 2015: Sunday PinaSaya
 2014: Party Pilipinas
 2013: Aksyon Primetime Balita
 2012: Cassandra, Warrior Angel
 2011: Wasak With Lourd & Jun
 2010: Baikinggu 
 2009: Baywalk
 2008: Shall We Dance 
 2007: SOP: Sobrang Okay Pare
 2006-2012: Wow Mali
 2005: Maynila
 2005: Bubble Gang
 2005: Wowowee
 2004: Magpakailanman 
 2004: MTB: Ang Saya Saya
 2003: ASAP Natin To!
 2003: Maalala Mo Kaya
 2002: Strangebrew

Films
 2021: Ang Fraile
 2019: Pandanggo Sa Hukay
 2018: Goyo: Ang Batang Heneral
 2018: Kusina Kings
 2017: Dormitoryo: Mga Walang Katapusang Kuwarto
 2016: My Candidate
 2014: Kubot The Aswang Chronicles 2
 2014: Mumbai Love
 2013: Blue Bustamante
 2011: Rakenrol
 2006: Wag kang lilingon
 2006: Imahe Nasyon
 2005: Sa Ilalim ng Cogon
 2003: Keka

References

External links
 

Male actors from Cebu
Filipino film directors
Living people
1973 births
Filipino male film actors
Filipino male television actors
Filipino television personalities